Saron may refer to:

Places
 Saron, a small village in Denbighshire, Wales
 Saron (Cantabria, Spain) a village of Santa Maria de Cayón Municipalitie
 Saron, Carmarthenshire, a small mining village in West Wales near Ammanford
 Saron Baptist Chapel, Carmarthenshire
 Saron, Gwynedd, a hamlet near Caernarfon (grid reference SH4659)
 Saron, Western Cape, a town in South Africa
 Saron, Thiruvannamalai,a township in the Indian district of Thiruvannamalai
 Pikin Saron, an indigenous village in Suriname
 Saron Chapel, Aberaman, Rhondda Cynon Taf, Wales

Other uses
 Saron, a mythical king who gave his name to the Saronic Gulf
 A Biblical name also written as Sharon
 Saron Läänmäe (born 1996), Estonian footballer
 Saron (instrument), an instrument in the Indonesian gamelan ensemble 
 Saron Gas, original name of hard rock band Seether
 SARON, Swiss Average Rate Overnight, an interest rate statistic
 Saron (crustacean), a genus of shrimp

See also
 Sarin, an organophosphorus compound with the formula [(CH3)2CHO]CH3P(O)F used as a chemical weapon
 Sauron, a character in The Lord of the Rings
 Sarong, a garment of Indonesian origin and widely worn throughout South and Southeast Asia